Michael or Mike Cassidy may refer to:
Michael Cassidy (Canadian politician) (born 1937)
Michael E. Cassidy (born 1955), Pennsylvania politician
Michael Cassidy (actor) (born 1983), American film and television actor
Michael Cassidy (sailor) (1837–1908), American Civil War sailor and Medal of Honor recipient
Mike Cassidy (entrepreneur), American entrepreneur; CEO and co-founder of Internet start-ups
Mike Cassidy (Canadian football) (1926–2011), American and Canadian football player
Mick Cassidy (born 1973), English rugby league player
Michael Cassidy (evangelist) (born 1936), South African Christian evangelist